Wang Zixiang (born 27 February 1998) is a Chinese footballer who plays as a goalkeeper for Shenzhen FC.

Career

In 2016, Wang joined the youth academy of Spanish La Liga side Granada after training with Udinese in the Italian Serie A and trialing for Dutch club Vitesse,

Before the 2018 season, Wang was sent on loan to Beijing Sport University in the Chinese second division, where he made 2 league appearances and scored 0 goals.

Before the 2019 season, he signed for Chinese top flight team Chongqing Liangjiang Athletic.

References

External links
 

Chinese footballers
Expatriate footballers in Spain
Living people
Association football goalkeepers
China League One players
Shenzhen F.C. players
1998 births
Chinese expatriate sportspeople in Spain
Footballers from Beijing